Proctor Creek may refer to:

Proctor Creek (Etowah River tributary), a stream in Georgia
Proctor Creek (Missouri), a stream in Missouri
Metropolitan Atlanta Rapid Transit Authority's Green Line (for which it was named), a spur line serving only Bankhead station
Puget Creek near Tacoma, Washington